Bernard Finegan (b Annagh, County Cavan 15 August1837; d. Cavan 17 January 1887) was an Irish prelate who briefly served in the Roman Catholic Church as the Bishop of Kilmore from 1886 to 1887. He was educated a Kilmore Academy.

Finegan was educated at St Patrick's College, Maynooth. Prior to his episcopal career, Finegan was the parish priest of Drumlane from March 1880 to May 1886. He was appointed the Bishop of the Diocese of Kilmore by Pope Leo XIII on 10 May 1886 and the papal brief was dispatched on 18 May 1886. Finegan's episcopal consecration took place on 13 June 1886; the principal consecrator was James Donnelly, Bishop of Clogher, and the principal co-consecrators were Thomas McNulty, Bishop of Meath and Bartholomew Woodlock, Bishop of Ardagh and Clonmacnoise.

Bishop Finnegan died in office on 11 November 1887, aged 50.

Notes

References

 
 

1837 births
1887 deaths
Roman Catholic bishops of Kilmore
19th-century Roman Catholic bishops in Ireland
Alumni of St Patrick's College, Maynooth
People from County Cavan